Lemang (Minangkabau: lamang) is a Minangkabau traditional food made from glutinous rice, coconut milk and salt, cooked in a hollowed bamboo tube coated with banana leaves in order to prevent the rice from sticking to the bamboo. Originating in Indonesia, it is also found in Singapore, Malaysia, and Brunei, as similar dishes made from sticky rice in bamboo are common throughout Mainland Southeast Asia.

Lemang is traditionally eaten to mark the end of daily fasting during the annual Muslim holidays of Eid-ul-Fitr and Eid-ul-Adha (Lebaran).

History
Sticky rice in bamboo is known as a ubiquitous traditional food in many traditional Southeast Asian communities. In Minangkabau culture, lemang or lamang is a traditional food which consists of glutinous rice or tapai that are used in various traditional ceremonies, mainly in West Sumatra, Indonesia. According to Minangkabau tradition, the cooking technique of lemang was first introduced by Sheikh Burhanuddin. However, lemang are also known as traditional foods of other tribes in Southeast Asian region, and their cooking method is still very ancient and depends on the natural materials and ingredients, including bamboo tubes.

In early Indonesian literature, lemang was mentioned in Marah Rusli's 1922 novel Siti Nurbaya, in which Nurbaya unwittingly eating a poisonous lemang due to Meringgih's evil scheme.

Cooking method

The bamboo contains glutinous rice, salt and coconut milk that is placed onto a slanted position besides a small fire with the opening facing upwards. It should be turned regularly in order to ensure the rice inside the bamboo is cooked evenly. The cooking process takes about 4–5 hours. Lemang is often served with rendang or serundeng.

Distribution and traditions
In Indonesia, lemang is associated with Minangkabau tradition of West Sumatra. Nevertheless, rice cooking method using bamboo tubes is widespread in the region, including Brunei, Minahasa, Dayak and Orang Asli tribes. The Minahasan version of this dish is known as Nasi Jaha, which is cooked in the same method.

In Minangkabau tradition, lemang making is called Malamang. Lemang is incomplete if it is not eaten together with tapai, so they are likened to a man and a woman by Minang people. Lemang itself describes the togetherness of Minang people because its making process is always done together. There are several taboos that must be obeyed in making lemang and tapai. Lemang are also used as gifts when visiting other people’s homes, for example, when visiting in-laws or manjapuik marapulai ceremony. However, there is no symbolic meaning behind the obligatory existence of lemang at traditional ceremonies. On the other hand, lemang and tapai are famous for their unique taste produced by the chemical components in their ingredients. In this article, the origin of lemang and tapai, the philosophy and presentation of lemang in the traditions of the Minangkabau people, and the flavor features of lemang and tapai from a scientific perspective are discussed.

Iban people usually prepare lemang for celebrations such as the harvest festival of Hari Gawai, lemang is usually eaten with meat dishes such as chicken curry. The cooking process used in making lemang for many different meats, also known as pansoh or pansuh by indigenous Dayak communities.

Gallery

See also
 Ketupat
 Lemper
 Lontong
 Sticky rice in bamboo

References

External links
 

Glutinous rice dishes
Padang cuisine
Malay cuisine
Indonesian cuisine
Indonesian snack foods
Indonesian rice dishes
Malaysian cuisine
Islamic cuisine